John Cargill may refer to:

John Cargill (politician) (1821–1898), New Zealand politician
Sir John Cargill, 1st Baronet (1867–1954), British chairman of the Burmah Oil Company, 1904–1943

See also
Cargill (surname)